General John B. Frisbie (May 20, 1823 – May 11, 1909), served in the California legislature and during the Mexican–American War he served in the US Army.
He was a founder of the cities of Vallejo, California, and Benicia, California.

Frisbe was born on May 20, 1823, in Albany, New York, and was educated at The Albany Academy. He practiced law in Buffalo, and upon the outbreak of the Mexican–American War traveled to California as a captain. After the war, he remained in California, and was a merchant in Sonoma County, California. He ran for Lieutenant Governor of California in 1849, but was defeated by John McDougal. He married Epifania de Guadalupe Vallejo (the daughter of Mariano Guadalupe Vallejo) in 1850. He founded Vallejo, California, and named it after Mariano Vallejo. Frisbe became the vice president of California Pacific Railroad in 1869.

The steamship General Frisbie, built 1900, was named for Frisbie.

References

Further reading
 Detailed information about his early life and role in the Mexican–American war, 1846–1848, can be found in his autobiography, John B. Frisbie Reminiscences.
 Frisbie's life is chronicled in Integral Outsiders, The American Colony in Mexico City 1876–1911, by William Schell Jr.

American military personnel of the Mexican–American War
Members of the California State Legislature
American city founders
19th-century American politicians
1823 births
1909 deaths
Politicians from Vallejo, California
The Albany Academy alumni